Until recently, the British Overseas Territory of Gibraltar had the strictest prohibition on abortion in Europe. 

Under Section 16 of the 2011 Crime Act, it stated that abortion in Gibraltar was punishable by life imprisonment including anyone assisting in the abortion. However, nobody was convicted of this crime in modern times. 

In 2021, the 2021 Gibraltar abortion referendum was held, asking the populace whether to legalize abortion. It won the approval of 63% of voters. Under the new law, abortions will be allowed within 12 weeks of pregnancy, if continuation of pregnancy would be risky to the woman's mental or physical health, and afterwards, when fetuses have fatal physical defects.

See also

2021 Gibraltar abortion referendum

References

Gibraltar law
Health in Gibraltar
Gibraltar
Gibraltar
Human rights in Gibraltar
Women in Gibraltar